Darryl Osmond Chellis (born 3 April 1936) is a former Australian politician.

He was born in Burnie, Tasmania. In 1985 he was elected to the Tasmanian Legislative Council as the independent member for Westmorland. He served until his retirement in 1991.

References

1936 births
Living people
Independent members of the Parliament of Tasmania
Members of the Tasmanian Legislative Council